is a visually impaired Japanese long-distance runner. Competing in the T11 classification, Shinya has represented his country at the 2012 Summer Paralympics in London, where he took the bronze medal in the men's 5000m T11 race. He is also a multiple World and Asian Para Games medalist, taking six medals over four tournaments.

Personal bests

Gallery

Results

World

Regional

Notes

References

External links 
Shinya Wada - International Paralympic Committee Athlete Bio
Shinya Wada (in Japanese) - Japan Blind Marathon Association
Shinya Wada (in Japanese) - The Nippon Foundation Paralympic Support Center
Shinya Wada Supporting Group Facebook (in Japanese)
Takashi Nakata (in Japanese) - Guide Runner

1977 births
Living people
Sportspeople from Osaka Prefecture
Kansai University alumni
Japanese male long-distance runners
Paralympic athletes of Japan
Athletes (track and field) at the 2012 Summer Paralympics
Athletes (track and field) at the 2016 Summer Paralympics
Athletes (track and field) at the 2020 Summer Paralympics
Medalists at the 2012 Summer Paralympics
Medalists at the 2020 Summer Paralympics
Paralympic medalists in athletics (track and field)
Paralympic bronze medalists for Japan
Visually impaired long-distance runners
Medalists at the 2014 Asian Para Games
Medalists at the 2018 Asian Para Games